Sporobolus heterolepis, commonly known as prairie dropseed, is a species of prairie grass native to the tallgrass and mixed grass prairies of central North America from Texas to southern Canada. It is also found further east,  to the Atlantic coast of the United States and Canada, but is much less common beyond the Great Plains and is restricted to specialized habitats. It is found in 27 states and four Canadian provinces.

Description

They terminate in small spikelets, which each contain a single fertile floret. When it blooms, the floret has three reddish anthers and a short feathery stigma.

The bracts each are long and tapered, with sharply pointed tips.

Prairie dropseed is a fine-textured grass with long, narrow leaves that arch outward, forming attractive, round tufts. The leaves range in color from a rich green hue in summer to a golden rust color in the fall. Foliage is resilient enough to resist flattening by snow, so it provides year-round interest. From late July to mid-September, the grass blooms with rusty-tan flowers that rise  in height.

It occurs in a wide range of soils, doing well in moist to dry conditions. It is much less common in wetlands.

Ecology
It is a larval host to the Poweshiek skipper.

Uses
The grass is cultivated as an ornamental plant in gardens because of its attractive bunchgrass form.  Because of its drought tolerance, it has been used on green roofs. The seedhead is sometimes described as having the vague scent of fresh popcorn, cilantro, or sunflower seeds.

Prairie dropseed is also used for roadside revegetation and prairie restoration projects. It is difficult to establish by direct seeding. Transplanting greenhouse-grown seedlings is a more effective method of establishing it.

Native Americans ground the seeds of the grass to make flour, and many species of birds eat the seeds.

References

External links

Prairie Dropseed, plants & seeds from Prairie Nursery
Prairie dropseed from Chicago Wilderness Magazine

heterolepis
Grasses of North America
Bunchgrasses of North America
Warm-season grasses of North America
Grasses of Canada
Grasses of the United States
Native grasses of the Great Plains region
Flora of the United States
Flora of Eastern Canada
Flora of the Northeastern United States
Flora of the North-Central United States
Flora of the Southeastern United States
Plants used in Native American cuisine
Garden plants of North America
Bird food plants
Drought-tolerant plants
Flora without expected TNC conservation status